Addison John Baker Cresswell (1 October 1788 – 5 May 1879) was a British Conservative politician.

Cresswell was elected Conservative Member of Parliament for North Northumberland at the 1841 general election but was unseated at the next election in 1847. He was the elder brother of lawyer Sir Cresswell Cresswell.

References

External links
 

UK MPs 1841–1847
1788 births
1879 deaths
Conservative Party (UK) MPs for English constituencies